"People in Love" is a song by British band 10cc, released as a single in 1977. It appears on the album Deceptive Bends and was the group's third and final single from the album. The song reached No. 40 on the Billboard Hot 100 (their last Top 40 hit on that chart to date), No. 74 in Australia and No. 90 in Canada.

Record World said that it's "smooth, rather moody, and right for any number of formats."

Chart performance

References

10cc songs
1976 songs
1977 singles
Songs written by Eric Stewart
Songs written by Graham Gouldman
Mercury Records singles